The 2017 Warwickshire County Council election took place as part of the 2017 local elections in the UK. All 57 councillors were elected for single-member electoral divisions for a four-year term.  The voting system used was first-past-the-post.

Boundary changes took effect at this election after a review by the Local Government Boundary Commission for England.

The result was Conservative councillors formed a majority of 15 on the council which had been three seats short of any single political grouping's control before the election.  The second-largest party became ten councillors of the Labour Party and the balance of the council became formed by seven Liberal Democrats.

Results summary

|}

North Warwickshire

North Warwickshire had 7 seats.

Nuneaton and Bedworth

Nuneaton and Bedworth had 13 seats.

Rugby

Rugby had 13 seats.

Stratford-on-Avon

Stratford-on-Avon had 13 seats.

Warwick

Warwick had 14 seats.

References

2017
2017 English local elections
2010s in Warwickshire